Black Mountain is a landmark mountain south of the Las Vegas Valley. It is one of the more prominent of the mountains in the McCullough Range.

Another mountain, adjacent to Interstate 515 in Henderson, is commonly called Black Mountain, including by the city of Henderson. It is actually an unnamed peak.

Black Mountain is home to the transmission towers of many of the Las Vegas area's television and radio stations.

Hiking and Day Use 
Several trails converge near Black Mountain within the Sloan Canyon National Conservation Area. These trails provide access to much of the conservation area with trail BLM 404 leading to the summit of Black Mountain.

The trail is 6.8 miles, moderately trafficked out, and back trail rated as strenuous due to the last half mile including class two rock scrambling. The trail is primarily used for hiking, walking, trail running, and nature trips and is best used from September until May.

In popular culture 

 In the 2010 post-apocalyptic role-playing game Fallout: New Vegas, Black Mountain is explained as being a pre-War transmission station, and due to heavy radiation from nuclear blasts was rendered uninhabitable by humans.  Recently, the mountain has become populated by numerous super mutants and Nightkin under the leadership of Tabitha in the "State of Utobitha".  Using the transmitters, Tabitha broadcasts her call to Black Mountain via a radio station, accessible in-game as "Black Mountain Radio". This location is most likely a reference to the real world KLAS-TV transmit station situated atop Arden Peak along the greater McCullough Range.

References

External links 
 

Mountains of Clark County, Nevada
Mountains of Nevada